Weldon Brown (born May 12, 1987) is an American former gridiron football player. He played college football as a cornerback at Louisiana Tech University. Weldon was signed as an undrafted free agent by the Jacksonville Jaguars of the National Football League (NFL) on April 26, 2009 after the 2009 NFL Draft. He played in the Canadian Football League (CFL) with the Edmonton Eskimos from 2010 to 2012 and the Saskatchewan Roughriders from 2013 to 2015.

References

External links
 Saskatchewan Roughriders profile 
 Edmonton Eskimos player profile

1987 births
Living people
American football cornerbacks
American players of Canadian football
Edmonton Elks players
Jacksonville Jaguars players
Louisiana Tech Bulldogs football players
Saskatchewan Roughriders players
Sportspeople from Bossier City, Louisiana
Players of American football from Louisiana